West Virginia Route 69 is a north–south state highway located within Wetzel County, West Virginia. The southern terminus of the route is at U.S. Route 250 (US 250) in Hundred. The northern terminus is at the Pennsylvania state line three miles (5 km) north of Hundred, where WV 69 continues northward as Pennsylvania Route 18 (PA 18).

Route description
WV 69 begins at an intersection with US 250 in Hundred, heading east on two-lane undivided Pennsylvania Avenue. The road passes through the commercial downtown before entering residential areas. The route leaves Hundred and heads into forested areas with some homes and fields. WV 69 winds to the north as it heads through more rural areas before reaching the Pennsylvania border, where the road continues into that state as PA 18.

Major intersections

References

069
Transportation in Wetzel County, West Virginia